Leslie Ata (born 14 October 1963) is a retired weightlifter who represented the Solomon Islands.

Ata competed in two Olympics, the first was at the 1984 Summer Olympics held in Los Angeles, where he finished 16th, and then again at the 1992 Summer Olympics in Barcelona, where he was the only competitor for the Solomon Islands and he finished 29th.

After retiring he became a weightlifting coach, and won the Solomon Islands Coach of the Year in 2010. He is now the President of the Solomon Islands Weightlifting Federation.

Major results

References

External links
 

1963 births
Living people
Solomon Islands male weightlifters
Olympic weightlifters of the Solomon Islands
Weightlifters at the 1984 Summer Olympics
Weightlifters at the 1992 Summer Olympics
Weightlifters at the 1990 Commonwealth Games
Commonwealth Games competitors for the Solomon Islands